Curl Curl is a suburb of northern Sydney in the state of New South Wales, Australia,  north-east of the Sydney central business district, in the local government area of Northern Beaches Council. It is part of the Northern Beaches region.

Location
Curl Curl Lagoon and Greendale Creek, separate Curl Curl from North Curl Curl. Neighbouring suburbs include Freshwater (Boundary along Brighton Street) Brookvale (Boundary along Harbord Road), Wingala is an adjacent locality. Curl Curl Beach runs along the eastern border and extends to North Curl Curl Beach.

Beach
The stretch of beach at Curl Curl is divided into North and South Curl Curl beaches. Curl Curl is known for some of the best surfing on the Northern Beaches.

Curl Curl Beach has two volunteer surf lifesaving clubs, South Curl Curl SLSC established in 1918 and North Curl Curl SLSC established in 1922. Northern Beaches Council employs professional lifeguards to patrol this beach from the end of September until Anzac Day. There are saltwater rockpools at each end of the beach.

History
The name Curl Curl appears to be the original Aboriginal name for the larger area of Manly Vale, Freshwater, Queenscliff. The name Curl Curl may have been derived from a Dharuk Aboriginal phrase curial curial, meaning river of life.

The name Curl Curl Lagoon was originally applied to Manly Lagoon, which empties into the ocean at Queenscliff. The lagoon that empties into the ocean at Curl Curl Beach was named Harbord Lagoon until it was renamed Curl Curl Lagoon as part of a renaming program in the 1980s. Manly Creek was originally named Curl Curl Creek and Queenscliff Headland was called Curl Curl Headland.

In 1858 Samuel Bennett (who died 1903) paid £600 for a  property, in the Curl Curl/Brookvale area south of Greendale Creek and was farmed by Bennett up until the mid-1870s. This area was later known as Brighton Park.

Land for St. James Anglican Church was dedicated on 3 November 1928, was opened in 1929 which is now the Warringah Church of Christ on Park Street.

Population
At the 2016 census, there were 2,414 residents in Curl Curl. 70.1% of people were born in Australia. The next most common country of birth was England at 6.2%. 83.0% of people only spoke English at home. The most common responses for religion were No Religion 34.2%, Catholic 27.4% and Anglican 15.5%.

Family households at 78.2% were the main type of household, with single person households at 16.8%. Median monthly mortgage payments were $3,100, much higher than the national median of $1,755.

Environment 
Curl Curl went from being a pristine environment to a tip during the 20th Century. banked by sandstone hills to the South, the ocean to the East and Greendale Creek / Curl Curl Lagoon to the North. In 1980 the local community formed Curl Curl Lagoon Friends to bring the lagoon and its catchment back to good health.

Sport and recreation
Parks and playing fields are located on either side of Curl Curl Lagoon and Greendale Creek. These areas were originally low-lying swampy land that was reclaimed by dumping rubbish on both sides of the lagoon throughout the 1950s and 1960s.

Curl Curl Youth Club has organised soccer and netball since 1958.

Curl Curl Amateur Swimming Club runs regular Saturday afternoon swim events during the spring and summer months at the South Curl Curl rock pool. The club commenced in 1966 and has been running swimming events every year for swimmers of all ages and abilities ranging from learners to competitive athletes.

1st/2nd Harbord Scouts meet at the scout hall at 43 Stirgess Ave. The Scout hall was opened in 1957 after Mrs Olive Pinkerton donated the land, with Scouts meeting at St. James school hall on Curl Curl Parade from 1929

Harbord Bowling & Recreation Club has four greens and regularly holds world-class tournaments.

Dog walking is permitted off leash on Adam St Reserve and Flora and Richie Roberts Reserve

Public transport
Curl Curl is serviced by six bus routes, 136 Manly to Chatswood, 139 Manly to Warringah Mall, E65 South Curl Curl to Sydney CBD, E76 Dee Why to Wynyard, E77 Dee Why to Wynyard, and the 159 Manly to Dee Why.

Schools
Freshwater Senior Campus which is part of Northern Beaches Secondary College is for year 11 and 12 students, located on the corner of Harbord Road and Brighton Street, Curl Curl. Manly Campus which is part of Northern Beaches Secondary College is for year 7 to 12 students, located on the corner of Abbott Road and Harbord Road, Curl Curl.

Stewart House is located across the road from South Curl Curl beach and provides students with an opportunity for a break from their current circumstances. Stewart House opened in March 1935, more than 150,000 children have benefited from a stay at Stewart House.

Curl Curl North Public School is a primary school located at Playfair Road near Abbott Road.

Wildlife

Bird life 

The lagoon and creek provide refuge for numerous birds, both those that depend primarily on the water and its fringes for food and breeding (the water birds), and many others that feed in the trees and the grassy areas that surround the lagoon (the bush birds).

See also 
 List of reduplicated Australian place names

References 

Suburbs of Sydney
Beaches of New South Wales
Surfing locations in New South Wales
Northern Beaches Council